Samson Lane Faison (November 29, 1860 – October 17, 1940) was a brigadier general in the United States Army who commanded the 30th Infantry Division at various times during World War I.  He received the Distinguished Service Medal for his significant role in the breaking of the German's Hindenburg Line.

Personal life
Samson L. Faison was born in Faison, North Carolina (Duplin County) to Elias James Faison and Elizabeth Maria Lane.  He had four brothers and two sisters.  A North Carolina state historical marker stands today in the town bearing his name, birthplace, and accomplishments.  Faison married Eleanor Sowers in 1906 and had two children, S. Lane Faison Jr. and Eleanor.  His son Lane had a distinguished career as an art historian, member of the OSS's Art Looting Investigation Unit in World War II, and long-time faculty member at Williams College.

Career highlights

Apache Wars and Geronimo Campaign
Several of his fellow classmates at West Point would go on to become general officers in their careers, such as Charles W. Kennedy, George H. Cameron, Harry C. Hale, George W. Read, John W. Heard, Ira A. Haynes, Omar Bundy, William C. Langfitt, Robert D. Walsh, Lawrence Tyson, Charles G. Morton, Tyree R. Rivers, John W. Ruckman, Isaac Littell and Clarence R. Edwards.

Following his graduation, he served in the Arizona Territory with the 1st Infantry from 1883-1886 during the final years of the Apache Wars.   In 1885, Lt. Faison was selected by General George Crook to lead Apache Scout Companies into Mexico to help track down the Apache war leader, Geronimo.  Faison was in the field for 11 months during 1885–1886 and was one of the few officers present at the council between Crook and Geronimo in March 1886, famously documented by photographer C. S. Fly.  General Crook later recognized Faison and six other officers "for bearing uncomplainingly the almost incredible fatigues and privations as well as the dangers incident to their operations" while they "commanded expeditions or Indian Scouts in Mexico."  In 1898 Faison wrote a memoir of his experience in the 1885-1886 Geronimo Campaign, which was published posthumously in 2012 in the Journal of the Southwest.

West Point and the Philippines
From 1896-1899, Lt. Faison was senior instructor of infantry tactics at the United States Military Academy.  In 1899, Captain Faison left West Point to participate in the Philippine–American War where he served in several combat operations against the Philippine insurrection with the 13th Infantry.  He also served as adjutant general and later as judge advocate of military commissions and as judge of the provost court in the Philippines until 1902.  That fall he returned to the US and assumed command of Fort Mason in San Francisco.

Army War College
Major Faison attended the United States Army War College from 1910 to 1911. Upon graduation, he served briefly as an instructor and administrator.

World War I

After the United States entered the war, Colonel Faison accepted a wartime promotion of brigadier general in August 1917 and command of the 60th Brigade of the 30th Infantry Division.  General Faison commanded the Division for several periods during both its training phase in South Carolina and while in France.  During the 2nd Somme offensive in September–October 1918, Faison's 60th brigade is said by at least one source to have been the first Americans to break through the German Hindenburg Line at Bellicourt, France.  Faison's Distinguished Service Medal citation reads as follows:

General Faison commanded with great credit the 60th Infantry Brigade, 30th Division, in the breaking of the enemy's Hindenburg line at Bellicourt, France, and in subsequent operations in which important captures were made, all marking him as a military commander of great energy and determination.

Later career and life
After the world war, Faison returned to his permanent rank of colonel, but was officially promoted to brigadier general in 1922.  He retired from active duty later that same year because of physical disabilities.  Faison died in Baltimore, Maryland on October 17, 1940 at the age of 79 and is buried at Arlington National Cemetery.

Awards and honors

Here is the ribbon bar of Brigadier General Faison:

Bibliography
Strategy and Tactics

References

External links

New York Times Obituary
1-22infantry.org

1860 births
1940 deaths
People from Faison, North Carolina
United States Military Academy alumni
United States Army War College alumni
American military personnel of the Philippine–American War
United States Military Academy faculty
United States Army generals of World War I
Military personnel from North Carolina
United States Army personnel of the Indian Wars
Apache Wars
Samson
United States Army War College faculty
Recipients of the Distinguished Service Medal (US Army)
Officiers of the Légion d'honneur
Recipients of the Croix de Guerre 1914–1918 (France)
Burials at Arlington National Cemetery
United States Army generals